South Llano River State Park is located in the Hill Country of Texas and is managed by the Texas Parks and Wildlife Department. It lies in the valley of the Llano River. The park, which consists of 2,600 acres along the south bank of the Llano River, opened to the public in 1990.

History
The park's land was donated by its previous owner, Walter Buck Jr., whose family had used the land for livestock and pecan harvesting.

Nature and Wildlife
The park contains a diverse variety of wildlife, including many birds, mammals (including the ringtail), and snakes. It also contains the endangered Tobusch fishhook cactus.

See also
List of Texas state parks
Walter Buck Wildlife Management Area

References

External links 
 South Llano River State Park

State parks of Texas
Protected areas of Kimble County, Texas
Protected areas established in 1990
1990 establishments in Texas